Better Man or Betterman may refer to:

Films
 The Better Man (1914 film), a lost 1914 silent film directed by William Powers 
 The Better Man (1926 film), an American silent film directed by Scott R. Dunlap
 A Better Man (film), a 2017 Canadian documentary film co-directed by Attiya Khan and Lawrence Jackman

Songs 
 "Better Man" (Little Big Town song), 2016
 "Better Man" (PartyNextDoor song), 2017
 "Better Man" (Pearl Jam song), 1994
 "Better Man" (Robbie Williams song), 2001
 "Better Man" (The Warren Brothers song), 1999
 "Better Man" (Westlife song), 2019
 "A Better Man" (Clint Black song), 1989
 "A Better Man" (Thunder song), 1993
 "Betterman", by John Butler Trio from Three
 "Betterman", by Virginia to Vegas from A Constant State of Improvement
 "Better Man", by 5 Seconds of Summer from Youngblood
 "Better Man", by Lady Antebellum from Golden
 "Better Man", by The Prom Kings from their self-titled album
 "Better Man", by Oasis from Heathen Chemistry
 "Better Man", by Paolo Nutini from Caustic Love
 "Better Man", by Hellyeah from Stampede
 "A Better Man", by Shayne Ward from Shayne Ward, 2006

Television 
 Better Man (2016 TV series), a 2016 Taiwanese TV drama series
 Better Man (miniseries), a 2013 Australian miniseries
 Betterman (TV series), a 1999 Japanese anime series
 "The Better Man" (The Venture Bros.), an episode of the American adult animated television series The Venture Bros.

Other uses
 The Better Man (novel), 2000 novel by Anita Nair
 A Better Man, a 2019 novel by Louise Penny
 A Better Man, a 2002 album by Ogie Alcasid

See also 
 "Better Man, Better Off", a 1997 song by Tracy Lawrence 
 Better (disambiguation)
 Bettermann (disambiguation)